YOC may refer to:

 Old Crow Airport
 The Young Ornithologists' Club
 Slang for Antioch, California
 Yeshiva of Cleveland